Kenneth Joseph McDonald  (born June 1959) is a Canadian politician who is the Member of Parliament (MP) for the riding of Avalon, and the former mayor of Conception Bay South, the second largest municipality in the Canadian province of Newfoundland and Labrador.

Municipal politics 
McDonald was Conception Bay South's councillor for Ward 3 from 1993-1996 and from 2009-2013. McDonald unsuccessfully ran for mayor in 2005 against Woodrow French, coming second out of four candidates. On September 24, 2013, McDonald defeated French 3273 votes to 1703 during that year's municipal elections.

In April 2015, McDonald threatened to block Nalcor Energy's heavy trucks from using roads in Conception Bay South during the construction at Muskrat Falls for the Lower Churchill Project. After negotiations, the trucks were allowed as long as drivers drove below the speed limit and Nalcor repaired any damage.

In 2014, McDonald closed a deal for a new town hall, which along with a stadium and fire house, account for $40 million of facilities scheduled to be completed in Fall 2015, of which C.B.S. would be responsible for $13.2 million. As a councillor in 2010, McDonald opposed a $20 million plan to build a larger town hall because he prioritized other issues such as access to water and sewage services.

Federal politics 
McDonald was the Liberal candidate for the riding of Avalon in the 2015 Canadian federal election, replacing Scott Andrews, who was ejected from caucus in March 2015 after allegations of sexual misconduct. McDonald was elected with over 55% of the vote, defeating Andrews, who finished second.

He was re-elected in the 2019 and 2021 federal elections.

Personal life 
McDonald has lived in Conception Bay South his entire life. Outside politics McDonald runs a home appliance repair business. He has a son, born in 1986.

Electoral history

References

External links 

 

1959 births
Living people
Mayors of places in Newfoundland and Labrador
Liberal Party of Canada MPs
People from Conception Bay South
Newfoundland and Labrador municipal councillors
Members of the House of Commons of Canada from Newfoundland and Labrador
21st-century Canadian politicians